Samuel David Smith (born Thorndale, Texas, on February 11, 1918 — May 23, 1999) was an American artist.

Early life 

He was born February 11, 1918, in Thorndale, Texas, to Otto Franklin Smith and Jeanette Joyce.  His paternal grandmother, Caroline Daugherty, was the half sister of Charles Goodnight Jr. the famous Texas cattle baron.  Sam’s father was a carpenter and building contractor.  His mother Jeanette was a school teacher.  Sam had two siblings, his sister, Marian Jeanette Smith (Messemer) and a half brother, Frank Vaughn Smith.   Slim employment opportunities forced the family to relocate several times, finally settling in Albuquerque, New Mexico, in 1925.  Sam Smith attended Albuquerque High School, but dropped out in the tenth grade at the age of 13 to apprentice himself to various New Mexico artists such as Randall Davey, Fletcher Martin, Nicolai Fechin and Carl Von Hassler.

Combat artist 

World War II brought Sam Smith the opportunity to display his talent on a large scale.  He enlisted in the US Army in February, 1941 in Santa Fe, New Mexico.  He attended basic training at Camp Barkeley, nine miles southwest of present-day Abilene, Texas.  Here, he volunteered to paint a patriotic Texas State mural over the entrance to the camp service club.   His artistic ability earned him a set of orders after boot camp as an Army Combat Artist.  Technical Sergeant Smith spent the rest of his time in the Army painting and sketching combat scenes in West Africa and the China-Burma-India Theater. In December 1944 he was part of a C-47 crew that was forced to bail out over South China. Rescued by local villagers, he was given shelter and secretly transported out of hostile territory.  The governor of Liping County of Guizhou provided him with a document which the artist said helped him obtain assistance in reaching allied forces.

Post War work
Sam Smith returned to New Mexico after the war and in March, 1948 he married Harriette Holley Hening, the daughter of Horace Brand Hening, a New Mexico pioneer resident and editor of The Albuquerque Journal and The New Mexico Stockman.   Smith began construction of a home and studio at 213 Utah Street in Albuquerque.  In 1950 he began a teaching career in the College of Fine Arts at the University of New Mexico.   He taught watercolor and oil painting until his retirement in 1986.  Sam and Holley had three children, all born in April, three years apart:  Cézanne, Rembrandt and Michelangelo.  In 1962 Smith purchased a home at 432 West Colorado Ave. in Telluride, Colorado.  At that time Telluride was, for the most part, a ghost town with Idarado Mining Company the only significant employer.  The Smith family spent summers there and wintered over during a sabbatical the Artist took in 1963.  Unfortunately, his wife Holley was plagued throughout her life by mental instability and depression.  In 1974 she took her own life.  Sam married Elizabeth Childers Black on May 31, 1978.  He sold his home in New Mexico and moved with Elizabeth to Colorado.  They spent winters in Telluride and summers on a houseboat on Navajo Lake near Bloomfield, NM.

A Sam Smith Retrospective show was held in the fall of 1986 at the University of New Mexico Fine Arts Center in Albuquerque, NM.

In June, 1995 the Department of Defense 50th Anniversary of World War II Commemoration Committee honored the combat art of Smith and his fellow veteran artists with an exhibition held at the National Building Museum in Washington, DC. Featured works powerfully illustrate various aspects of World War II, ranging from battle scenes to the everyday lives of military men and women.

Smith’s paintings have been exhibited at the Metropolitan Museum in New York, the Biltmore Galleries in Los Angeles, the Corcoran Gallery in Washington, D.C., the New Mexico Museum of Art in Santa Fe, the Fine Arts Galleries at the University of New Mexico and the Roswell Museum and Art Center.  His work can be seen in the permanent collections of the Panhandle Plains Historical Museum in Canyon, Texas, Arlington State College in Texas, and the New Mexico State Fair Collection.  His awards include the 1960 Oil Purchase Prize at the New Mexico State Fair, the Questa Purchase Prize in 1962, the Grand Award Prize at the Artist’s Alpine Holiday Show in 1964 and 1965 and the Grand Award at the Black Canyon Art Exhibition in Hotchkiss, Colorado.

Notable students of Sam Smith include the artists Dennis Liberty, Elaine Amsterdam Farley and Nick Abdalla.

References

Further reading
 Art and Artists of New Mexico, New Mexico Magazine, December 1957, by Ina Sizer Cassidy
 UNM Prof Demonstrates his Art, Albuquerque Journal, Journal of the Arts, Sunday, October 31, 1971, by Flo Wilks
 The Cowboy's Christmas Tree, 1956 by Eddy, Effie Paige, Illustrated by Sam Smith

External links 
 Sam D. Smith at the United States Air Force Art Collection

1918 births
1999 deaths
20th-century American painters
American male painters
American war artists
Artists from New Mexico
Artists from Texas
University of New Mexico faculty
Artists of the American West
Painters from New Mexico
Painters from Texas
People from Thorndale, Texas
Military personnel from Texas
20th-century American male artists